John Williams Harris (1808–4 February 1872) was a New Zealand trader, whaler, and farmer. He was born in Cornwall, United Kingdom, in 1808.

References

1808 births
1872 deaths
New Zealand farmers
New Zealand traders
New Zealand people in whaling
British emigrants to New Zealand
New Zealand people of Cornish descent
Farmers from Cornwall